"Entourage" is a song by American singer Omarion. It was written by Omarion, Andre Merritt, and Eric Hudson for his second studio album 21 (2006), while production was helmed by Hudson. The song was released as the album's first single and reached the top 30 on the New Zealand Singles Chart and on the US Hot R&B/Hip-Hop Songs. The official remix features rapper 50 Cent.

Music video
The video sees Omarion arriving at a party where fans are anxiously awaiting his arrival. While stepping out of the car, he sees a girl in front of him and tries to get some time to talk to her but keeps on being interrupted by fans etc. During the bridge we see Omarion, at times singing against a black and gold backdrop. Omarion also performs a short dance routine with several other dancers. The video ends with him and the girl leaving the party in his car. There are cameos made by former B2K member Lil Fizz, Tyrese Gibson & Tommy Davidson.

Track listing

Notes
 signifies an additional producer

Charts

Release history

References

2006 singles
Epic Records singles
Omarion songs
Songs written by Eric Hudson
Songs written by Andre Merritt
Song recordings produced by Eric Hudson
2006 songs
Songs written by Omarion